Thyroid hormone receptor alpha (TR-alpha) also known as nuclear receptor subfamily 1, group A, member 1 (NR1A1), is a nuclear receptor protein that in humans is encoded by the THRA gene.

Function 

The protein encoded by this gene is a nuclear hormone receptor for triiodothyronine. It is one of the several receptors for thyroid hormone, and has been shown to mediate the biological activities of thyroid hormone. Knockout studies in mice suggest that the different receptors, while having certain extent of redundancy, may mediate different functions of thyroid hormone. Alternatively spliced transcript variants encoding distinct isoforms have been reported.

Role in pathology 
Mutations of the THRA gene may cause nongoitrous congenital hypothyroidism-6, a subtype of congenital hypothyroidism.

Interactions 

THR1 has been shown to interact with:

 COPS2,
 EP300, 
 ITGB3BP,
 MED1, 
 MED6, 
 MED12,  
 MED16,
 MEF2A,
 NCOA6,
 TRIP11, and
 UBC.

References

Further reading 

 
 
 
 
 
 
 
 
 
 
 
 
 
 
 
 
 
 

Intracellular receptors
Transcription factors